The  was the first aviation unit established by the Imperial Japanese Navy in 1916 and survived until the end of the Pacific War. It was charged with educating and training aviation personnel, practical testing of new aircraft, and tactical research. In the event of an emergency, it was supposed to take charge of the defense of Tokyo Bay, and from February 1944, when the war situation demanded it, the unit was also involved in combat.

History
The "Naval Aviation Research Committee", which was established in 1912, has laid the foundation for the Imperial Japanese Navy Air Service. With the start of domestic production of aircraft and training of crew members on track, the Air Corps Three Group Plan was established in 1916 in order to further improve aircraft. On 1 April 1916 the Yokosuka Naval Air Group was formed in Oppama, Yokosuka, Kanagawa Prefecture to replace the "Naval Aviation Research Committee".

On 1 September 1923 the Great Kanto Earthquake caused great damage to facilities and equipment. On 1 June 1930 the first class of naval flight reserve trainees joined the service, and after that preparatory training was conducted in Yokosuka until 1945. Around 1932 Minoru Genda who worked as instructor at Yokosuka created an aerobatic squadron called "Genda Circus" which served to increase the public appeal of the Navy Air Service.

Once the Pacific War started on 8 December 1941 the unit continued its training and testing role. From February 1944 the unit was ordered to be deployed in combat.  On 15 June 1944, with the launch of Operation A-Go, it formed a part of the 27th Air Flotilla and Yawata Air Attack Unit and was deployed to Iwo Jima to support the Mariana Islands operations. Due to intensive air combat and enemy air raids on Iwo Jima, all aircraft had been lost by 4 July 1944. The remaining service members returned to Yokosuka by transport plane, but some stayed on Iwo Jima and lost their lives defending the island. Afterwards the unit was moved to Kyushu and engaged in kamikaze attacks and air defense battles in the Kantō area.

Its former site is currently occupied by the Nissan Oppama car manufacturing plant.

Commanders
The list is based on the Japanese wiki article.
Capt. Shiro Yamauchi: April 1, 1916 – December 1, 1917
Capt. Masaku Harada: December 1, 1917 – July 1, 1919
Rear Adm. Yoshida Kiyukaze : July 1-December 1, 1919
Capt. Tajiri Yuji: November 12, 1920 – November 1, 1922
Capt. Marubashi Seiichiro: November 1, 1922
Capt. Inoue Shiro: December 1, 1923 – December 1, 1924
Cdr Ichikawa Daijiro: December 1, 1924 – November 1, 1927
Capt. Hideho Wada: November 1, 1927 – November 30, 1929
Capt. Goro Hara: November 30, 1929 – April 2, 1931
Capt. Yamada Tadoji: April 2, 1931 – November 15, 1932
Capt. Onishi Jiro: November 15, 1932-November 15, 1934
Capt. Sugiyama Toshiro: November 15, 1934 – December 1, 1936
Capt. Miami Sadazo: December 1, 1936 – July 11, 1937
Capt. Torao Kuwahara: December 25, 1937 – November 15, 1938
Rear Adm. Totsuka Michitaro: December 15, 1938 – October 20, 1939
Rear Adm. Torao Kuwahara: January 15, 1940 – November 15, 1940
Capt. Ueno Keizo: November 15, 1940 – November 17, 1942
Rear Adm. Ryunosuke Kusaka: November 23, 1942 – November 20, 1943
Rear Adm. Sadayoshi Yamada: December 6, 1943 – March 15, 1944
Vice Adm. Shunichi Kira : March 15-July 10, 1944
Rear Adm. Hattori Katsuji: July 10-September 29, 1944
Capt. Kato Yoshio: September 29, 1944 – March 20, 1945
Rear Adm. Chiaki Matsuda: March 20, 1945-

References

Bibliography
引頭文博「[ 横須賀海軍航空隊の概況]」『軍港と名勝史蹟』軍港と名勝史蹟発行所、1933年、pp.44-53。
 『海軍飛行豫科練習生 第一巻』 国書刊行会、1983年。
海軍歴史保存会『日本海軍史』第9巻、第10巻、第一法規出版、1995年。
『官報』

See also
Oppama Naval Air Group -Separated from Yokosuka Naval Air Group to train maintenance personnel.
List of air groups of the Imperial Japanese Navy

Groups of the Imperial Japanese Navy Air Service
Battle of Iwo Jima
Military units and formations established in 1916
Military units and formations disestablished in 1945